Florida's 14th congressional district is an electoral district for the U.S. Congress and includes western Hillsborough County and southeastern Pinellas County, including most of Tampa. In the 2020 redistricting cycle, the district was redrawn to include almost all areas in both counties which faces Tampa Bay, while northeastern Tampa and its neighbouring suburbs are redistricted into the 15th district. The 14th district also includes MacDill Air Force Base and Tampa International Airport.

The former 14th district, in 2003–2012, was located in the Gulf Coast region in Southwestern Florida and included all of Lee County and portions of Charlotte and Collier counties. Fort Myers, Naples, Cape Coral and part of Port Charlotte were located in the district.

From 2013 to 2017, the district was assigned to western Hillsborough County, Florida and Manatee County. After the district boundaries changed in 2017, it was located entirely inside of Hillsborough County and included all of Tampa.

The district is currently represented by Democrat Kathy Castor.

Presidential elections

List of members representing the district

Election results

2002

2004

2006

2008

2010

2012
Following the 2010 United States Census, the Florida 11th congressional district was renumbered into the 14th congressional district, and Kathy Castor became the incumbent.

2014
Kathy Castor, the incumbent Representative for Florida's 14th Congressional District, stood unopposed in the 2014 election.

2016

2018
Kathy Castor, the incumbent Representative for Florida's 14th Congressional District, stood unopposed in the 2018 election.

2020

2022

Historical district boundaries

References

 Congressional Biographical Directory of the United States 1774–present

14